Bethany Ashton Wolf is an American film director and screenwriter.

Wolf is the writer and director of  Forever My Girl (2018), and was one of the writers of Don's Plum, a film starring Leonardo DiCaprio and Tobey Maguire which has been prevented from being released in the United States due to litigation.

Biography 
Wolf is a native of Lake Charles, Louisiana. Wolf graduated from St. Louis Catholic High School before moving to Los Angeles.

Wolf started her career as an actress in Los Angeles, California.
In 2006, Little Chenier was Wolf's debut film as director.

Wolf has been married to comedian Josh Wolf since 2004, and they have three children together.

Filmography 
Selected filmography (director and writer):
 2001 Don's Plum''' - as writer.
 2006 Little Chenier (2006) - as director, producer, writer.
 2014 Midnight Juliet - director, writer. Short drama.
 2018 Forever My Girl'' (2018) - director, writer.

References

External links

 Bethany Ashton Wolf at filmaffinity.com

Living people
American women film directors
Place of birth missing (living people)
Year of birth missing (living people)
American women screenwriters
21st-century American women